That's Life! is a 1986 American comedy-drama film directed by Blake Edwards and starring Jack Lemmon and Julie Andrews.

The film was made independently by Edwards using largely his own finances and was distributed by Columbia Pictures.

That's Life! was shot in Edwards and his wife Andrews' own beachside home in Malibu and features their family in small roles, including Edwards' daughter Jennifer Edwards, Andrews' daughter Emma Walton Hamilton and Lemmon's son Chris Lemmon portraying Andrews and Lemmon's adult offspring, while the senior Lemmon's wife Felicia Farr portrays a fortune teller.

Because of the film's independent status, many of the cast and crew were paid below union-level wages, resulting in the American Society of Cinematographers picketing the film during production and taking an advertisement in Variety in protest. As a result, the original director of photography, Harry Stradling Jr., was forced to quit the film and was subsequently replaced by Anthony B. Richmond, a British cinematographer.

Plot summary
Harvey Fairchild is a wealthy, Malibu-based architect who is turning 60 and suffering from a form of male menopause. He feels aches and pains, real or imaginary, and seems unhappy with his professional and personal life.

Harvey's patient wife, famous singer Gillian Fairchild, tries to cheer him with family get-togethers and an elaborately planned birthday party this weekend. But she secretly has worries of her own, a lesion on her throat, possibly cancerous, the biopsy results which she won't get until after the weekend.

Whining his way through day after day, Harvey snaps at his pregnant daughter Megan and makes rude remarks to his actor son Josh. The miserable Harvey is furious with a client named Janice Kern who can't stop revising her plans for a magnificent house Harvey has been building, but he, wanting to get over his depression, succumbs to her sexual advances, although they don't go through with it solely because he can't get it up. Although a lapsed Catholic, he tries going to confession, only to discover that the priest to whom he is confessing is "Phony" Tony Baragone, his Notre Dame roommate and an old rival. He also consults a local fortune teller, Madame Carrie, sex with whom leaves Harvey with a severe case of crabs (pubic lice).

Gillian bravely hides her cancer fear from the family, but finally, overcome with emotion, she confides in her friend and neighbor, Holly.

Harvey threatens to spoil the birthday party for everybody. He is in such a foul mood that just because a friend named Belmont tells him a depressing story about an illness, he amuses himself by introducing Belmont to the crab-infected fortune teller, who, by coincidence, Gillian has hired to entertain at the party.

Gillian warns her husband that he is going to lose everything if he continues to behave this way. During his party, Gillian's doctor arrives to inform her that the biopsy test results are negative and she is going to be all right. She takes Harvey aside to let him know just how precious life really can be.

Cast
 Jack Lemmon as Harvey Fairchild
 Julie Andrews as Gillian Fairchild
 Sally Kellerman as Holly Parrish
 Robert Loggia as Father Baragone
 Jennifer Edwards as Megan Fairchild Bartlet
 Rob Knepper as Steve Larwin
 Matt Lattanzi as Larry Bartlet
 Chris Lemmon as Josh Fairchild
 Cynthia Sikes as Janice Kern
 Dana Sparks as Fanny Ward
 Emma Walton as Kate Fairchild
 Felicia Farr as Madame Carrie
 Theodore Wilson as Corey
 Jordan Christopher as Dr. Keith Romanis

Reception
That's Life grossed $4 million against a $10 million budget making this a box office failure.

The film's critical reviews were mixed. On Rotten Tomatoes it has an approval rating of 53% based on reviews from 15 critics, with an average rating of 5.80/10.

Accolades

References

External links
 
 

1986 films
1986 comedy-drama films
1986 independent films
American comedy-drama films
American independent films
Columbia Pictures films
1980s English-language films
Films about depression
Films about marriage
Films directed by Blake Edwards
Films scored by Henry Mancini
Films set in Malibu, California
Films shot in Los Angeles County, California
Films with screenplays by Blake Edwards
1980s American films